Joseph Coulon de Villiers, Sieur de Jumonville (September 8, 1718 – May 28, 1754) was a French Canadian military officer. His defeat and killing at the Battle of Jumonville Glen by forces led by George Washington was one of the sparks that ignited the Seven Years' War, also known as the French and Indian War in the United States.

Early life 
Jumonville was born in the seigneury of Verchères, New France (now part of Quebec), the son of Nicolas-Antoine Coulon de Villiers, a French military officer. He began service with the French military at age 15, in his father's unit.

He served in the army during several conflicts with native groups in the western Great Lakes region where he was stationed with his father and several of his brothers. His father and one of his brothers were killed at Baie-des-Puants (present Green Bay, Wisconsin) in 1733 during a battle with the Fox tribe. In 1739, he served in Governor Bienville's abortive expedition against the Chickasaw nation.  He was later promoted to Second Ensign and was stationed in Acadia during King George's War (as the North American theater of the War of the Austrian Succession is sometimes called).  In 1745 he married Marie-Anne-Marguerite Soumande of Montreal.

Battle of Jumonville Glen 

In June 1754, Jumonville was posted to Fort Duquesne with his older half-brother, Louis Coulon de Villiers. The French were building up military strength, much of it Amerindian recruitment in the disputed territory of the Ohio Country in response to an increasing presence by British American traders and settlers.

On May 23, 1754, Jumonville took command of a 35-man detachment from the fort and headed southeast. The exact nature of Jumonville's mission has been the subject of considerable debate, both at the time and up to the present day. Officially, his mission was to scout the area south of the fort. The French would later claim that he was a diplomat on a peaceful mission to deliver a message to the British. The British contended that he was sent to spy on their garrison at Fort Necessity and their road-building project. Tanacharison, known as the Half King and the leader of a band of new Iroquoian peoples allied to the British, the Mingos, believed he was planning an ambush.

On May 27, 1754, a group of Native American scouts discovered Jumonville's party camped in a small valley (later called Jumonville Glen) near what is now Uniontown, Pennsylvania. Half King went to Washington and pleaded with him to attack the French encampment, claiming it was a hostile party sent to ambush them.

Washington took a detachment of about 40 men and marched all night in a driving rain, arriving at the encampment at dawn. What happened next, like so much about the incident, is a matter of controversy. The British claimed the French discovered their approach and opened fire on them. The French claimed the British ambushed their encampment. In either event, the battle lasted little more than 15 minutes and was a complete British victory. Ten French soldiers were killed and 21 captured, including the wounded Jumonville.

Washington treated Jumonville as a prisoner of war and extended him the customary courtesies due to a captured military officer. Washington attempted to interrogate Jumonville but the language barrier made communication difficult. During their conversation, however, the Half King walked up to Jumonville and, without warning, struck him in the head with a tomahawk, killing him.

Why the Half King did this has never been clear. He had been kidnapped by the French and sold into slavery as a child. He claimed that the French had boiled and eaten his father. He was also a representative of the Iroquois Confederacy, which stood to lose its authority over other Indian peoples in the Ohio River Valley if the French were able to assert their control.

Other accounts state that de Jumonville was not, in fact, captured but was one of the first killed by Washington's expeditionary forces. Adam Stephen, a military officer who had accompanied Washington to the scene, stated that Jumonville "was killed the first fire." No reference was made to Jumonville's having been captured and unsuccessfully interrogated by Washington. Also, it is unclear as to whether de Jumonville was dispatched by bullet or tomahawk. In his footnotes added to Washington's journal in 1893, J.M. Toner stated that Half-King "was credited in certain quarters with having slain that officer [Jumonville] with his hatchet; but this was without any foundation in fact."

When word reached Fort Duquesne about the incident, Jumonville's half brother, Captain Coulon de Villiers, vowed revenge. He attacked Washington and the garrison at Fort Necessity and forced them to surrender on July 3, 1754. In the surrender document, written in French, Coulon de Villiers inserted a clause describing Jumonville's death as an "assassination".

Washington was heavily criticized in Britain for the incident. British statesman Horace Walpole referred to the controversy surrounding Jumonville's death as the "Jumonville Affair" and described it as "a volley fired by a young Virginian in the backwoods of America that set the world on fire."

Jumonville's legacy 
Jumonville's legacy was to resonate significantly throughout the Seven Years' War in the French national consciousness. As noted above, within a month of Jumonville's death, his younger brother, Captain Coulon de Villiers, marched on Fort Necessity on the 3rd of July and forced Washington to surrender. The parley between Washington and de Villiers was to be conducted in French, given that they were the victors. However, Fowler's research of the accounts of the engagement from Washington and his men reveal that only two of Washington's company spoke French: William La Peyronie and Jacob Van Braam. As such, La Peyronie and Van Braam were instructed to negotiate with Villiers, but La Peyronie had been seriously wounded in the initial engagement. Consequently, the terms were left to Van Braam to resolve.  Braam, a former lieutenant in the Dutch army and a teacher of French in Virginia, alongside a captain in the Virginia Regiment, was Washington's de facto French and Dutch translator. That said, Van Braam's capability of translating French has been questioned in historiography given that it was not his first language. Ultimately, more research is required on Van Bramm's own life to corroborate his capabilities as a translator. Regardless, Fowler has translated the terms Van Braam eventually agreed to after consulting Washington:

Crucially, the terms Van Braam presented to Washington articulated that Jumonville had been an ambassador assassinated by Washington. The use of "assassinated" created a political pejorative that placed Washington and his men as the guilty party in the affair. Washington was only able to avoid a political scandal surrounding the Jumonville "assassination" affair by insisting he had not comprehended the text Van Braam had given to him, and even going so far as to accuse Van Braam of incompetence or duplicity.

The terms agreed to at Fort Necessity provided a nascent notion of Jumonville as an innocent Frenchman murdered by Washington and his men. Early research by Marcel Trudel and Donald Kent in the 1950s has demonstrated how the notion of Jumonville's killing being a murder gained currency in France, with Bishop de Pontbriand in a pastoral letter (1756) declaring:

Trudel and Kent go on to demonstrate how pamphleteer Francois-Antoine Chevrier's 1758 mock-heroic poem 'L'Acadiade; Ou, Prouesses Angloises En Acadie, Canada and Antoine-Leonard Thomas' epic 1759 poem Jumonville further lamented Jumonville's death at the hands of Washington's men. These works were hyperbolic in nature and often stressed the innocence of Jumonville and played off nationalistic sentiment which incited nationalistic revenge, evident by the subject of Thomas' poem: "the assassination of Monsieur de Jumonville, and the vengeance for this murder."  The underlining significance of these nationalistic sentiments has only recently been highlighted by David Bell's research in the early 2000s. Bell, in his analysis of Thomas' Jumonville, several engravings and illustrations of Jumonville's death, and Jesuit papers commenting on the affair, demonstrates how France seized the concept of international warfare to further nurture an embryonic sense of patriotism and nationalism among its subjects.  It is in this sense how Jumonville's legacy is best understood: as a French martyr utilised by the French war literature to mobilise public opinion surrounding the nation. Indeed, the war-martyr as an emblematic symbol of the nation to promote national sentiment was a growing trend across Europe.

See also 

 Fort Necessity
 Jumonville

Notes

References

External links 
National Park Service Site - Jumonville Glen
 
 Jumonville Street (Pittsburgh, PA)

1718 births
1754 deaths
Jumonville, Ensign Joseph de
People of Louisiana (New France)
Coulon de Villiers, Sieur de Jumonville, Joseph
People from Verchères, Quebec